The Republic of the Congo, competing as Congo, first participated at the Olympic Games in 1964, and has sent athletes to compete in most Summer Olympic Games since then.  Congo missed the 1968 Games and boycotted the 1976 Games along with most other African nations.  Congo has never participated in the Winter Olympic Games.

As of 2016, a total of 74 athletes (45 men and 29 women) have represented Congo at the Olympics. The youngest participant was Alphonse Yanghat, who ran in the 100 m sprint in 1972 at 15 years, 120 days, while the oldest was Gilles Coudray (36 years, 263 days) who competed in the 50 metres freestyle swimming event at the 1992 Barcelona Olympics. No athlete from Congo has ever won an Olympic medal, however Franck Elemba finished fourth in the men's shot put at the 2016 Summer Olympics.

The National Olympic Committee for the Congo was created in 1964 and recognized by the International Olympic Committee that same year.

Medal tables

Medals by Summer Games

See also
 List of flag bearers for the Congo at the Olympics
 List of participating nations at the Summer Olympic Games

External links
 
 
 

 
Olympics